Killarney House is an Irish country home in Killarney, County Kerry, which was built as a replacement for Kenmare House (1726) as the seat of the Earls of Kenmare. The site was chosen by Queen Victoria on her visit to Ireland in 1861.

First Killarney House
It was The 4th Earl of Kenmare who decided to build a new mansion on a hillside with views of Lough Leane in 1872. The old manor, Kenmare House, was demolished and an Elizabethan-Revival manor house on a more elevated site erected at a cost was well over £100,000.

This house was supposed to have been instigated by Lady Kenmare (Gertrude Thynne, granddaughter of The 2nd Marquess of Bath) and inspired by Lord Bath's genuinely Elizabethan seat, Longleat, Wiltshire (which is not red-brick); but it was not unusual for the descendants of Elizabethan or Jacobean settlers in Ireland to assert their comparative 'antiquity' in this period by building Jacobethan houses. The architect was George Devey but, according to Jeremy Williams, "... that feeling of being built up over the centuries that distinguished Devey's work was entirely lacking, partly due to the job being supervised by W.H. Lynn [the Belfast architect] at his most relentless ... The westernmost gate lodge, gabled and galleried, [which survives, is] Devey at his most delightful."

The house, in addition to its other defects, apparently did not sit happily in the landscape as it had many gables and many oriels. The interior was panelled and hung with Spanish leather. It was considered one of the finest mansions in Ireland. It was burnt out twice - once in 1879, just after its completion, and again, and finally, in August 1913 and never rebuilt. Instead, The 5th Earl of Kenmare decided to convert the nearby stable block of the old Kenmare House for family use, also naming it "Kenmare House".

Knockreer House
In 1956, Mrs Beatrice Grosvenor CBE (1915–1985), niece of the seventh Gerald Ralph Desmond Browne, 7th Earl of Kenmare (1896–1952) and granddaughter of the Duke of Westminster, built Knockreer House on the site of the former "Killarney House". The house was designed by Mrs Grosvenor's cousin Francis Pollen (1926–87). Knockreer House and the surrounding land, formerly part of the Kenmare Estate of the Earls of Kenmare, were later donated by Mrs Grosvenor to form Killarney National Park.

Second Killarney House
He and his wife Mary J. Horstmann (1907–1998) extensively renovated the building and renamed it "Killarney House". In 1978, Mr. McShain sold Killarney House and the greater part of the estate to the Irish State for a price well below market value at the time, having been assured that the house and estate would be incorporated into Killarney National Park. Mr and Mrs McShain reserved the house and surrounding 52 acres to their use for their lifetime. Mr McShain died in 1989 and Mrs McShain lived in the house until her death in 1998, when the house and surrounding land reverted to the Irish State. Having been empty for several years, the building fell into some disrepair. In July 2011 Leo Varadkar, then the Irish Minister for Transport, Tourism and Sport, therefore announced a €7 million restoration of the manor. After the completion of the restoration works, Killarney House was opened to the public on 3 April 2016.

References

External links
 Killarney House reference at the Parliament of Ireland
 Public Record Office of Northern Ireland: "Introduction Kenmare Papers", November 2007
 Killarney National Park: "Knockreer House"
 Killarney National Park: "Killarney House and gardens"

Buildings and structures in County Kerry
Killarney